Geir Grung (13 December 1926 – 16 March 1989) was a Norwegian architect. He was best known as a modernist who worked on a number of Norwegian power plants.

Biography
He was born in Bergen, Norway as a son of functionalist architect Leif Kuhnle Grung (1894-1945)  and Hjørdis Grace Lehmann (1895-1988).
He worked as an assistant at his father's architectural firm, while he also trained at Bergen Arts School (Bergens kunsthåndverksskole). After his father's death in 1945, he became a student at the Norwegian National Academy of Craft and Art Industry  in Oslo. Grung took the national architect examination (Statens arkitektkurs) in 1949.

In 1950, he established an architectural practice. In 1954 he entered into partnership with Georg Greve (Arkitektene Greve og Grung). When Greve retired in 1970, Grung continued on his own with the firm Geir Grung and after 1971 as Geir Grung A / S. Grung's start as an architect had coincided with an industrialization in the construction of building in Norway. He performed significant work in the context of hydro-power development. Grung was also a modernist and was involved with the group of architects known as Team 10. He was also an active participant in the Congrès International d'Architecture Moderne. 

Grung was married twice. in 1951, he married Karen Sophie Kaltenborn (1930-1983), the marriage dissolved 1974. In 1974, he married Dagny Kjøde (born 1945).

Selected works
Mykstufoss Power Plant portal building, 1964
Tysso II Power Plant, 1967
Senjaneset Transformer Station, Tyssedal, 1967
Høyenhall School, 1967
Lier Tunnel, 1963-73
Tonstad Power Plant, 1968  
 Tjørhom Power Plant, 1973  
 Duge Power Plant, 1973 
Rafnes Petrochemical Plant for Norsk Hydro,  1974-77

Gallery

References

Related reading
Risselada, Max and van den Heuvel, Dirk (eds), (2005) Team 10 1953-1981, In Search of A Utopia of the Present (nai010 Publisher, Rotterdam)   

1926 births
1989 deaths
Architects from Bergen
Modernist architects
Oslo National Academy of the Arts alumni
20th-century Norwegian architects